Labdia microdictyas is a moth in the family Cosmopterigidae. It was described by Edward Meyrick in 1923. It is known from Fiji.

References

Labdia
Moths described in 1923